Plasma membrane calcium-transporting ATPase 1 is a plasma membrane  ATPase, an enzyme that in humans is encoded by the ATP2B1 gene. It's a transport protein, a translocase, a calcium pump .

The protein encoded by this gene belongs to the family of P-type primary ion transport ATPases characterized by the formation of an aspartyl phosphate intermediate during the reaction cycle. These enzymes remove bivalent calcium ions from eukaryotic cells against very large concentration gradients and play a critical role in intracellular calcium homeostasis. The mammalian plasma membrane calcium ATPase isoforms are encoded by at least four separate genes and the diversity of these enzymes is further increased by alternative splicing of transcripts. The expression of different isoforms and splice variants is regulated in a developmental, tissue- and cell type-specific manner, suggesting that these pumps are functionally adapted to the physiological needs of particular cells and tissues. This gene encodes the plasma membrane calcium ATPase isoform 1. Alternatively spliced transcript variants encoding different isoforms have been identified.

ATP2B1 is a critical host factor supporting cytotoxicity caused by Chironex fleckeri (a type of box jellyfish) stings. Blocking ATP2B1 is believed to have therapeutic potential for treating pain and skin necrosis caused by these stings.

Clinical significance 
Mutations of the ATP2B1 gene cause autosomal dominant intellectual developmental disorder-66 (MRD66), a condition first described in 2022. MRD66 presents with developmental delay, mild to moderately impaired intellectual development and mild speech delay. Some 50% of patients suffer from epilepsy, and some patients have autism spectrum disorder.

References

External links

Further reading 

 
 
 
 
 
 
 
 
 
 
 
 
 
 
 
 
 
 

Transport proteins